Raphael Herburger (born 2 January 1989) is an Austrian professional ice hockey forward who is currently playing for HC Lugano in the National League (NL).

Playing career
Herburger returned to Austria after three seasons in Switzerland with EHC Biel of the top-tier National League A. He signed a two-year contract with reigning back-to-back Champions, EC Red Bull Salzburg on 2 May 2016.

Herburger competed in the 2013 IIHF World Championship as a member of the Austria men's national ice hockey team.

Career statistics

Regular season and playoffs

International

References

External links

1989 births
Living people
Austrian ice hockey centres
EHC Biel players
Dornbirn Bulldogs players
Ice hockey players at the 2014 Winter Olympics
EC KAC players
HC Lugano players
Olympic ice hockey players of Austria
People from Dornbirn
Sportspeople from Vorarlberg